Kálmán Kirchmayer (15 November 1897 – 6 November 1990) was a Hungarian tennis player. He competed in the men's singles and doubles events at the 1924 Summer Olympics.

References

External links
 

1897 births
1990 deaths
Hungarian male tennis players
Olympic tennis players of Hungary
Tennis players at the 1924 Summer Olympics
People from Rzeszów
20th-century Hungarian people